Harry "Pittsburgh Phil" Strauss (July 28, 1909 – June 12, 1941) was a prolific contract killer for Murder, Inc. in the 1930s. He reportedly killed over one hundred men (some historians put the number as high as 500) using a variety of methods, including shooting, stabbing with ice picks, drowning, live burial, and strangulation. Strauss never carried a weapon in case the local police picked him up on suspicion. He would scout his murder spot for any tool that would do the job.

Most of his associates called him "Pep". In the 1930s, he was committing assaults, larcenies, and drug dealing. He was arrested 18 times but was never convicted until he was found guilty of the homicide that sent him and fellow Murder Inc hitman Martin "Bugsy" Goldstein to the electric chair. After hitman Abe "Kid Twist" Reles turned informant, Strauss was arrested for the murder of Irving "Puggy" Feinstein, and at least five other known murders. Strauss tried to avoid conviction by feigning insanity in the courtroom and on death row. Strauss and Goldstein were convicted September 19, 1940, and executed by electrocution using Sing Sing's Old Sparky on June 12, 1941.

See also
 Capital punishment in New York (state)
 Capital punishment in the United States
 List of people executed in New York

References

Citations

Bibliography
Turkus, Burton B. and Sid Feder. Murder Inc: The Story of "the Syndicate". New York: Da Capo Press, 2003.

External links
Harry "Pittsburgh Phil" Strauss at Find A Grave
Harry "Pittsburgh Phil" Strauss - Gangster/Assassin at J-Grit: The Internet Index of Tough Jews

1909 births
1941 deaths
Jewish American gangsters
American people executed for murder
People from Brooklyn
Executed gangsters
20th-century executions by New York (state)
Murder, Inc.
People executed by New York (state) by electric chair
20th-century executions of American people
People convicted of murder by New York (state)
Burials at Beth David Cemetery
20th-century American Jews
Inmates of Sing Sing